Étang de Barrandon is a lake in Saint-Étienne-du-Valdonnez, Lozère, France. At an elevation of 1375 m, its surface area is 0.073 km².

Barrandon